Orbituliporidae is a family of bryozoans belonging to the order Cheilostomatida.

Genera

Genera:
 Atactoporidra Canu & Bassler, 1931
 Batoporella Héjjas, 1894
 Bicupularia Reuss, 1864

References

Cheilostomatida